Shin Seong-hyun (Hangul: 신성현, Hanja: 申成鉉; born October 19, 1990) is a South Korean infielder for the Doosan Bears of the KBO League. He joined the Hanwha Eagles in 2015. He played in the Hanwha Eagles from 2015 to 2017. He transferred baseball team through trade from Hanwha Eagles to Doosan Bears in 2017.

References

External links 

 Career statistics and player information from the KBO League
 Shin Sung-hyun at Doosan Bears Baseball Club

Living people
1990 births
Baseball players from Seoul
South Korean baseball players
KBO League infielders
Doosan Bears players